I. elegans  may refer to:
 Inquisitor elegans, a sea snail species
 Irus elegans, a bivalve mollusc species